There have been many Coptic versions of the Bible, including some of the earliest translations into any language. Several different versions were made in the ancient world, with different editions of the Old and New Testament in five of the dialects of Coptic: Bohairic (northern), Fayyumic, Sahidic (southern), Akhmimic and Mesokemic (middle). Biblical books were translated from the Alexandrian Greek version.

The Sahidic was the leading dialect in the pre-Islamic period, after the 11th century Bohairic became dominant and the only used dialect of the Coptic language.

Partial copies of a number of Coptic Bibles survive. A considerable number of apocryphal texts also survive in Coptic, most notably the Gnostic Nag Hammadi library. Coptic remains the liturgical language of the Coptic Church and Coptic editions of the Bible are central to that faith.

Old Testament 

Translators of books of the Old Testament into Egyptian dialects were naturally made from the Alexandrian Greek version (Septuagint), and there is no reason to doubt that they were translated at as early a date as the Gospels and Epistles, if not indeed before them. Portions of the Old Testament exist in each Egyptian dialect.

In Sahidic, some Biblical books survived with complete text, as well as a large number of extant fragments representing most of the canonical books and certain of the deutero-canonical (the two Wisdoms, the Epistle of Jeremiah, and the Greek additions to Daniel).

Some early manuscripts:
 Bodmer III – John 1:1–21:25, Genesis 1:1–4:2; 4th century; Bohairic
 Bodmer VI – Proverbs 1:1–21:4; 4th/5th century; Paleo-Theban ("Dialect P")
 Bodmer XVI – Exodus 1:1–15:21; 4th century; 
 Bodmer XVIII – Deuteronomy 1:1–10:7; 4th century; 
 Bodmer XXI – Joshua 6:16–25; 7:6–11:23; 22:1–2; 22:19–23:7; 23:15–24:2; 4th century; 
 Bodmer XXII – Jeremiah 40:3–52:34; Lamentations; Epistle of Jeremiah; Book of Baruch; 4th/5th century; 
 Bodmer XXIII – Isaiah 47:1–66:24; 4th century; 
 Bodmer XL – Song of Songs
 Bodmer XLIV – Book of Daniel; Bohairic.
 Schøyen Ms 114 – Psalms; Sahidic; c. 400.

New Testament 

The two main dialects, Sahidic and Bohairic, are the most important for the study of early versions of the New Testament. The Sahidic was the leading dialect in the pre-Islamic period. The earliest Bohairic manuscripts date to the 4th century 
, but most texts come from the 9th century and later.

Sahidic 

The collection of manuscripts of Sahidic translations is often designated by cop in academic writing and critical apparatus ("Sa" for "versio Sahidica" in BHS). The first translation into the Sahidic dialect was made at the end of the 2nd century in Upper Egypt, where Greek was less well understood. So the Sahidic is famous for being the first major literary development of the Coptic language, though literary work in the other dialects soon followed. By the ninth century, Sahidic was gradually replaced by neighbouring Bohairic, and disappeared. Knowledge of the Sahidic manuscripts was lost until they were rediscovered in the 18th century. In 1778 Woide issued a prospectus in which he announced his intention of publishing from Oxford manuscripts the fragments of the New Testament "iuxta interpretationem dialecti Superioris Aegypti, quae Thebaidica seu Sahidica appellantur". Another fragments were published in 1884 by Émile Amélineau. Amélineau also edited other fragments in 1886–1888.

Several years later Horner produced a critical edition of the Sahidic New Testament over the period 1911–1924. Horner's edition containing almost every verse of the entire New Testament. The Sahidic translation is a representative of the Alexandrian text-type.

The order of books: Gospels (John, Matthew, Mark, Luke), Pauline epistles (Hebrews between 2 Corinthians and Galatians), Catholic epistles, Acts, Apocalypse.

Omitted verses: 
Matthew 12:47
Matthew 16:2b–3; 17:21; 18:11; 23:14
Mark 9:44.46; 11:26; 15:28
Luke 17:36; 22:43–44
John 5:4; 7:53–8:11
Acts 8:37; 15:34; 24:7; 28:29
Romans 16:24.

Omitted or not included phrases:
Matthew 15:6 or (his) mother not included.
Luke 11:4 phrase "but deliver us from evil" is omitted. This omission is supported by the Greek manuscripts: Codex Sinaiticus, Codex Vaticanus, Codex Regius, f1, 700, and some early versions vg, syrs, copbo, arm, geo.

Textual variants 

In Luke 4:17 it has textual variant "and opened the book" together with the Greek manuscripts A, B, L, W, Ξ, 33, 892, 1195, 1241, ℓ 547, syrs, h, pal, copbo, against variant "and unrolled the book" supported by א, Dc, K, Δ, Θ, Π, Ψ, f1, f13, 28, 565, 700, 1009, 1010 and many other manuscripts.

In Luke 16:19 the version reads: "There was a rich man, with the name N[in]eue, who clothed himself". This reading has also Greek manuscript Papyrus 75 and two Greek minuscule manuscripts 36 and 37, have a scholion of uncertain date .

In Acts 27:37 it reads "seventy six" (as Codex Vaticanus) for "two hundred seventy six".

Some manuscripts 

Some of the more notable manuscripts of the Sahidic are the following.

 The Crosby-Schøyen Codex is a papyrus manuscript of 52 leaves (12x12 cm). It contains the complete text of Book of Jonah and 1 Peter (2 Maccabees 5:27–8:41, Melito of Sardis, Peri Pascha 47–105, unidentified Homily). It is dated to the 3rd or 4th centuries and is held at the University of Mississippi. 
 British Library MS. Oriental 7594 contains an unusual combination of books: Deuteronomy, Jonah, and Acts. It is dated paleographically to the late 3rd or early 4th century. 
 Michigan MS. Inv 3992, a papyrus codex, has 42 folios (14 by 15 cm). It contains 1 Corinthians, Titus, and the Book of Psalms. It is dated to the 4th century. 
 Berlin MS. Or. 408 and British Museum Or. 3518, being parts of the same original document. The Berlin portion contains the Book of Revelation, 1 John, and Philemon (in this order). It is dated to the 4th century.
 Bodmer XIX – Matthew 14:28–28:20; Romans 1:1–2:3; 4th or 5th century. 
 Bodmer XLII – 2 Corinthians; dialect unknown; Wolf-Peter Funk suggest Sahidic;

Bohairic 

The Bohairic (dialect of Lower Egypt) translation was made a little later, as the Greek language was more influential in lower (northern) Egypt. Probably, it was made in the beginning of the 3rd century. It was a very literal translation; many Greek words, and even some grammatical forms (e.g. syntactic construction μεν – δε) were incorporated to this translation. For this reason, the Bohairic translation is more helpful in the reconstruction of the early Greek text than any other ancient translation. 

The Bohairic translation was influenced by several variables, including the other dialects, primarily Sahidic and Fayyumic. When the patriarchate moved from Alexandria to Cairo in the 11th century, Bohairic was the dominant language of the Coptic church. As the official dialect of the Coptic Orthodox Church, Bohairic seems to enjoy a strong relationship with mainly the other dialects, Egyptian Arabic and—as it was for several centuries—Greek. The text is mainly Alexandrian, somewhat influenced by the Western text-type. The Bohairic translation is designated by copbo.

The order of books: Gospels (John, Matthew, Mark, Luke), Pauline epistles (Hebrews between 2 Thess and 1 Tim), Catholic epistles, Acts, and Apocalypse. The Apocalypse is preserved in relatively few manuscripts.

Omitted verses: Matthew 17:21 (some mss); 18:11 (mss); 23:14 (mss); Mark 9:44.46; 11:26 (mss); 15:28 (mss); Luke 17:36; 22:43–44; John 5:4 (mss); 7:53–8:11 (mss); Acts 8:37; 15:34 (mss); 24:7; 28:29; Romans 16:24.

It contains Matthew 12:47; Some manuscripts of the Bohairic version contains verses: 17: 21; 18:11; 23:14; Mark 11:26; 15:28; John 5:4; 7:53–8:11; Acts 15:34;

In Acts 27:37 it reads "one hundred seventy six" for "two hundred seventy six".

Some manuscripts 
The original {Old} Bohairic version is well represented by manuscripts. More than a hundred of manuscripts have survived. All have the last twelve verses of Mark.

 The earliest surviving manuscript of the four Gospels is dated AD 889. It is not complete.
 Papyrus Bodmer III is the oldest manuscript of the Bohairic version. It was discovered by John M. Bodmer of Geneva in Upper Egypt. It contains the Gospel of John, dated palaeographically to the 4th century. It contains 239 pages, but the first 22 are damaged.
 Huntington MS 17, bilingual Bohairic-Arabic, dated to 1174, the oldest manuscript with complete text of the four Gospels in Bohairic.
 Huntington MS 20, bilingual Bohairic-Greek, with complete text of the four Gospels.
 Oriental MS 424, bilingual Bohairic-Arabic, dated to 1308, with complete text of the Pauline epistles, Catholic epistles, and the Acts.
 Codex Marshall Or. 5.

The Bohairic version was employed by Mill for his edition of 1707. It was first published in 1716 by Wilkins, who edited "Novum Testamentum Aegyptium vulgo Copticum". His edition was accompanied with a Latin translation. Horner produced a critical edition of the Bohairic New Testament in 1898–1905. Horner used more than fifty Bohairic manuscripts preserved in that time in the libraries of Europe.

Middle Egypt 

The only surviving witnesses of an Akhmimic, and an Fayyumic Versions are in a fragmentary pieces (designated by copakh, and copfay).

 The Schøyen Codex, a papyrus manuscript. It contains Gospel of Matthew. Dated to the early 4th century. It is the earliest Matthew in any Coptic dialect.
 Codex Glazier, contains Acts 1:1–15:3, housed at the Pierpont Morgan Library.
 P. Mich. inv. 3521, Gospel of John in Fayyumic, ca. AD 325.

Textual features 

Mark 8:15
 the Herodians – , W, Θ, f1, f13, 28, 565, 1365, iti, itk, copsa, arm, geo
 Herod – copbo majority of Greek mss

In 1 John 5:6 two versions, Sahidic and Bohairic, have textual variant "through water and blood and spirit" supported by the manuscripts: Codex Sinaiticus, Codex Alexandrinus, 104, 424c, 614, 1739c, 2412, 2495, ℓ 598m, syrh, Origen. Bart D. Ehrman identified this reading as Orthodox corrupt reading.

Greek-Coptic diglot manuscripts 

More than forty Greek-Coptic diglot manuscripts of the New Testament have survived to the present day.

 Papyrus 2
 Papyrus 6
 Papyrus 41
 Papyrus 42
 Papyrus 62
 Papyrus 96
 Codex Borgianus
 Uncial 070
 Uncial 086
 Uncial 0100
 Uncial 0114
 Uncial 0129 (= 0203, ℓ 1575)
 Uncial 0164
 Uncial 0177
 Uncial 0184
 Uncial 0200
 Uncial 0204
 Uncial 0205
 Uncial 0236
 Uncial 0237
 Uncial 0238
 Uncial 0239
 Uncial 0260
 Uncial 0275
 Uncial 0276
 Uncial 0298
 Uncial 0299
 Lectionary 143
 Lectionary 961
 Lectionary 962
 Lectionary 963
 Lectionary 964
 Lectionary 965
 Lectionary 1353
 Lectionary 1355
 Lectionary 1575
 Lectionary 1602
 Lectionary 1603
 Lectionary 1604
 Lectionary 1606
 Lectionary 1607
 Lectionary 1614
 Lectionary 1678
 Lectionary 1739
 Lectionary 1994
 Lectionary 2210

Lectionaries 1993 and 1605 are trilingual manuscripts: 
 Lectionary 1993 – Coptic, Greek, and Arabic 
 Lectionary 1605 – Greek, Coptic, and Arabico

See also 

 Coptic (disambiguation)
 Coptic language
 Coptic literature
 Coptic Orthodox Church

Coptic manuscripts
 List of the Coptic New Testament manuscripts
 Old Testament fragment (Naples, Biblioteca Vittorio Emanuele III, I B 18)

Other versions
 Syriac versions of the Bible
 Slavic translations of the Bible

Notes

References

Further reading 
 Kurt Aland, and Barbara Aland, The Text of the New Testament: An Introduction to the Critical Editions and to the Theory and Practice of Modern Textual Criticism, 1995, Grand Rapids, Michigan.
 Augustini Ciasca, Sacrorum Bibliorum Fragmenta Copto-Sahidica Romae 1885.
 
 Alla Ivanovna Elanskai︠a︡, The Literary Coptic manuscripts in the A.S. Pushkin State Fine Arts Museum in Moscow, BRILL, 1994, pp. 397–472.
 Bruce M. Metzger, The Early Versions of the New Testament, Clarendon Press, Oxford 1977, pp. 99–152.
 Bruce M. Metzger, Bart D. Ehrman, The Text of the New Testament: Its Transmission, Corruption and Restoration, Oxford University Press, 2005, pp. 110–115.
 "Translations" The Oxford Companion to the Bible.
 Franz-Jürgen Schmitz, Gerd Mink, Liste der Koptischen Handschriften des Neuen Testaments. I, Die sahidischen Handschriften der Evangelien (Berlin and New York: Walter de Gruyter, 1991), vol. 1, part 1.
 Franz-Jürgen Schmitz, Gerd Mink, Liste der koptischen Handschriften des neuen Testaments, Walter de Gruyter, 1991, vol. 1, part 2, (pp. 1279) 
 Frederic Wisse, The Coptic Versions of the New Testament, in. The Text of the New Testament in Contemporary Research, ed. Bart D. Ehrman and Michael W. Holmes, William B. Eerdmans Publishing Company, Grand Rapids 1995, pp. 131–141.
 Henri Munier, Manuscrits coptes 1916.
 
 
 Wolfgang Kosack, Novum Testamentum Coptice. Neues Testament, Bohairisch, ediert von Wolfgang Kosack. Novum Testamentum, Bohairice, curavit Wolfgang Kosack. / Wolfgang Kosack. neue Ausgabe, Christoph Brunner, Basel 2014. .

External links 
 Online Coptic Version of The New Testament
 Horner: The Coptic Version of the New Testament in the Northern Dialect, otherwise called Memphitic and Bohairic. Vol. 1 Ⲙⲁⲧⲑⲉⲟⲥ, Ⲙⲁⲣⲕⲟⲥ/ Vol. 2 Ⲗⲟⲩⲕⲁⲥ, Ⲓⲱⲁⲛⲛⲏⲥ (1898), Vol. 3 Ⲡⲁⲩⲗⲟⲥ/ Vol. 4 Ⲕⲁⲑⲟⲗⲓⲕⲟⲛ ⲉⲡⲓⲥⲧⲟⲗⲏ, Ⲡⲣⲁⳉⲓⲥ ⲧⲟⲛ ⲁⲅⲓⲟⲛ ⲁⲡⲟⲥⲧⲟⲗⲟⲛ, Ⲁⲡⲟⲅⲁⲗⲩⲙⲯⲓⲥ (1905)
 Horner: The Coptic Version of the New Testament in the Southern Dialect, otherwise called Sahidic and Thebaic. Vol. 1 Ⲙⲁⲑⲑⲁⲓⲟⲥ, Ⲙⲁⲣⲕⲟⲥ/ Vol. 2 Ⲗⲟⲩⲕⲁ/ Vol. 3 Ⲓⲱϩⲁⲛⲛⲏⲥ (1911), Vol. 4/ Vol. 5 Ⲡⲁⲩⲗⲟⲥ (1920), Vol. 6 Ⲛⲉⲡⲣⲁⳉⲓⲥ ⲛⲛⲁⲡⲟⲥⲧⲟⲗⲟⲥ (1922), Vol. 7 incl. Ⲁⲡⲟⲕⲁⲗⲩⲯⲓⲥ (1924)

 Sortable articles
 
 
 
 Coptic Wikisource (̀ⲪⲂⲓⲕⲓⲡⲏ̇ⲅⲏ) Proposal
 ̀ⲪⲂⲓⲕⲓⲡⲏ̇ⲅⲏ (Coptic Wikisource) Development Project, currently in the Multilingual Wikisource.
 
 A Few Notes Concerning Mr. Joseph Warren Wells' Edition of the Sahidic and Bohairic Texts of the New Testament

Coptic Orthodox Church
Coptic
Early versions of the Bible
Coptic literature
Hebrew Bible versions and translations